Bangalore 560023 is a 2015 Indian Kannada sports comedy film directed by Pradeep Raj. The film stars Karthik Jayaram, Chandan Kumar, Chikkanna, Dhruva Sharma, and Rajeev along with Sanjjanaa and Shivani, making her acting debut. The film is a remake of the Tamil film, Chennai 600028 (2007) directed by Venkat Prabhu, which was a commercial hit.

The film was produced by Puneeth B. P. and Manu and the film's score and soundtrack were composed by Arun Andrews. The film is based on street cricket played in India, focussing on themes such as friendship, love and rivalry in a suburban area. The film's title is derived from the pincode for Magadi Road, a suburb of Bengaluru, where the story takes place.

Cast
 Karthik Jayaram
 Chandan Kumar 
 Dhruva Sharma
 Rajeev 
 Chikkanna
 Naveen Naidu ( Taj )
 Ramachandra Garuda 
 Shobhraj 
 Mimicry Gopi 
 Manu 
 Likith Shetty 
 Sanjjanaa
 Shivani

Soundtrack

Arun Andrews scored the film's background music and the soundtrack for the film. The lyrics for the soundtracks were written by Pradeep Raj, Chandan Shetty and Shailesh Raj. The soundtrack album consists of nine tracks which follow the same tunes of the Tamil original film composed by Yuvan Shankar Raja. It was released on 22 November 2014 in Bangalore, in the presence of the actors Sudeep and Yash, and the former cricketers Syed Kirmani and Vijay Bharadwaj.

Release
The film was certified U/A and released on 20 November 2015.

References

External links

 Bangalore 560023 at filmibeat.com

2015 films
Indian sports comedy films
2010s sports comedy films
Films about cricket in India
2010s Kannada-language films
Kannada remakes of Tamil films
Films directed by Pradeep Raj